Bimal Mitra (18 March 1912 – 2 December 1991) was an Indian writer in Bengali. Bimal Mitra was equally adept in writing in Bengali as well as in Hindi, and wrote more than one hundred novels and short stories.  Many of Bimal Mitra's novels have been made into successful films. One of his most popular works, Shaheb Bibi Golam (January 1953) which was adapted into a hugely popular movie. He also earned a Filmfare nomination for Best Story for the film.

Set in the last years of the nineteenth century, the novel tells the story of the sumptuous lifestyle and the decay of a feudal family. It is the story of Pateshwari, aka Chhoto Bou, a woman who wants to experience romance, to be a real wife, to invent for herself and live a new kind of conjugality. The book also tells the story of Calcutta, now Kolkata, and of all the people who lived there.

Asami Hazir is another popular work of Bimal Mitra. The novel is based on the true story of a man who wants to repent for the sins of his father and grandfather. The novel was adapted into a TV series for Doordarshan - Mujrim Hazir.

He had served in railways in Bilaspur for long years. He was working in the Chakradharpur Division in the 1940s in the Control Organisation. One of his novelettes Char Chokher Khela is based on the lives of the Anglo-Indian population of Chakradharpur railway colony.

He resigned from Indian Railway Services in 1950 at the age of 38 to become a full-time writer.

Mitra died on December 2, 1991, at his residence named "Baansh Bhavan" in Chetla, South Calcutta.

Literary works
 Saheb Bibi Golam (King, Queen and Slave)
 Kori Diye Kinlaam (Bought With Money) 	
 Begum Mary Bishwas (A Historical Novel of the Period of Nawab Siraujdalla / British Lord Clive)
 Ekak Dasak Shatak (Uni Deci Centi)
 Asami Hazir (At Your Service)
 Pati Param guru
 Rajabadal
 Sab Jhut hai
 Ei Norodeho (This Human body)
 Mrityuheen (Deathless)
 Tomra dujone mile
 Gulmohor
 Ja debi
Short stories
"Neelnesha"
"Bonshodhor"
"Lojjahoro"
"Jenana Sambad"
"Putul Didi"
"Amrutyu"
"Milonanto"
"Dori"
"Rekjon Mohapurush"
"RaniSaheba"
"Gharonti"
"Satashe Srabon"
"Ashukaka"
"Nimaontrito Indranath"
"Amir o Urboshi"

References

External links
A profile webpage
 

Bengali writers
Bengali-language writers
Recipients of the Rabindra Puraskar
1912 births
1991 deaths
Indian male novelists
Indian male short story writers
20th-century Indian novelists
20th-century Indian short story writers
People from Nadia district
Novelists from West Bengal
20th-century Indian male writers
Writers from Kolkata